Mitch Williams may refer to:
Mitch Williams (born 1964), American baseball player
Mitch Williams (politician) (born 1953), South Australian Liberal politician and farmer
Mitch Williams (General Hospital), a character in the soap opera General Hospital